Baron Bo Gustaf Bertelsson Carpelan (25 October 1926 – 11 February 2011) was a Finland-Swedish poet and author. He published his first book of poems in 1946, and received his PhD in 1960. Carpelan, who wrote in Swedish, composed numerous books of verse, as well as several novels and short stories.

In 1997, he won the Swedish Academy Nordic Prize, known as the 'little Nobel'. He was the first person to have received the Finlandia Prize twice (in 1993 and 2005). He won the 2006 European Prize for Literature. His poem, Winter was Hard, was set to music by composer Aulis Sallinen. He also wrote the libretto for Erik Bergman's only opera, Det sjungande trädet.

Carpelan died of cancer on 11 February 2011. He is buried in the Hietaniemi Cemetery in Helsinki. He was a member of the Finnish noble family Carpelan.

Carpelan went to Svenska normallyceum i Helsingfors and then studied history of literature at University of Helsinki. He became Doctor of Philosophy in 1960.

Selected bibliography
I de mörka rummen, i de ljusa (poetry collection, 1976)
Urwind (novel, 1993)
Berg (novel, 2005)

References

External links
1998 Interview with Bo Carpelan
Bo Carpelan in 375 humanists 28.03.2015, Faculty of Arts, University of Helsinki

1926 births
2011 deaths
Writers from Helsinki
Finnish writers in Swedish
Finlandia Prize winners
20th-century Finnish nobility
Finnish literary critics
Nordic Council Literature Prize winners
20th-century poets
Burials at Hietaniemi Cemetery
Opera librettists

Swedish-speaking Finns
21st-century Finnish nobility